Burger Branch is a stream in McMinn County and Monroe County, Tennessee, in the United States.

Burger Branch was named for the Burger family of pioneers who settled at the creek in the 1830s.

See also
List of rivers of Tennessee

References

Rivers of McMinn County, Tennessee
Rivers of Monroe County, Tennessee
Rivers of Tennessee